Sibylla of Anjou (–1165) was a countess consort of Flanders as the wife of Thierry, Count of Flanders. She served as the regent of Flanders during the absence of her spouse in 1147-1149.

First marriage
Sybilla was the daughter of Fulk V of Anjou and Ermengarde of Maine, In 1123, she married William Clito, son of the Norman Robert Curthose and future Count of Flanders. Sibylla brought the County of Maine to this marriage, which was annulled, narrowly, in 1124 on grounds of consanguinity. The annulment was made by Pope Calixtus II upon request from Henry I of England, William's uncle; Fulk opposed it and did not consent until Calixtus excommunicated him and placed an interdict over Anjou.

Countess consort of Flanders
In 1134, Sibylla married Thierry, Count of Flanders. During his absence on the Second Crusade the pregnant Sibylla acted as regent of the county. Baldwin IV, Count of Hainaut took the opportunity to attack Flanders, but Sibylla led a counter-attack and pillaged Hainaut. In response Baldwin ravaged Artois. The archbishop of Reims intervened and a truce was signed, but Thierry took vengeance on Baldwin when he returned in 1149.

In 1157 Sibylla travelled with Thierry on his third pilgrimage, but after arriving in Jerusalem she separated from her husband and refused to return home with him. She became a nun at the Convent of Sts. Mary and Martha in Bethany, where her step-aunt, Ioveta of Bethany, was abbess. Ioveta and Sibylla supported Queen Melisende and held some influence over the church, and supported the election of Amalric of Nesle as Latin Patriarch of Jerusalem over a number of other candidates. Sibylla died in Bethany in 1165.

Issue
Sibylla and Thierry had:
Philip, Count of Flanders
Matthew, Count of Boulogne, married Marie of Boulogne
Margaret, Countess of Flanders and Hainaut, married Baldwin V, Count of Hainaut
Gertrude, married Humbert III, Count of Savoy
Matilda
Peter

References

Sources

N. Huyghebaert, Une comtesse de Flandre à Béthanie, in "Les cahiers de Saint -André", 1964, n°2, 15p.

166-167
William of Tyre, A History of Deeds Done Beyond the Sea. E. A. Babcock and A. C. Krey, trans. Columbia University Press, 1943.

1110s births
1165 deaths
Year of birth uncertain
Daughters of kings
Countesses of Flanders
Women of the Crusader states
12th-century women rulers
Women in medieval European warfare
Women in 12th-century warfare
12th-century women from the county of Flanders
House of Anjou